The 1968–69 FA Cup was the 88th season of the world's oldest football cup competition, the Football Association Challenge Cup, commonly known as the FA Cup. Manchester City won the competition for the fourth time, beating Leicester City 1–0 in the final at Wembley, through a goal from Neil Young.

Matches were scheduled to be played at the stadium of the team named first on the date specified for each round, which was always a Saturday. Some matches, however, might be rescheduled for other days if there were clashes with games for other competitions or the weather was inclement. If scores were level after 90 minutes had been played, a replay would take place at the stadium of the second-named team later the same week. If the replayed match was drawn further replays would be held until a winner was determined. If scores were level after 90 minutes had been played in a replay, a 30-minute period of extra time would be played. The 1968–69 tournament was remarkable in that no second replays were required at any point throughout the main event.

Calendar

Results

First round proper

At this stage clubs from the Football League Third and Fourth Divisions joined 30 non-league clubs having come through the qualifying rounds. To complete this round, Leytonstone and Chesham United given byes. Matches were scheduled to be played on Saturday, 16 November 1968. Ten were drawn and went to replays two, three or four days later.

Second round proper
The matches were scheduled for Saturday, 7 December 1968. Nine matches were drawn, with replays taking place later the same week.

Third round proper
The 44 First and Second Division clubs entered the competition at this stage. The matches were scheduled for Saturday, 4 January 1969. Seven matches were drawn and went to replays.

Fourth round proper
The matches were scheduled for Saturday, 25 January 1969. Six matches were drawn and went to replays.

Fifth Round Proper
The matches were scheduled for Saturday, 8 February 1969. However, for the first time in history, the entire fifth round draw for the FA Cup was unable to be played due to heavy snowfall across England, and the matches were replayed at various times after this date. Most took place by the following Wednesday (one of these requiring a replay), two were played a fortnight later, but the final match was not played until 1 March and required a replay two days later.

Sixth Round Proper

The four quarter-final ties were scheduled to be played on 1 March 1969, although due to the late completion of Leicester City's fifth round tie, their match with Mansfield Town was not played until 8 March. There were no replays.

Semi-finals

The semi-final matches were played on Saturday 22 March and Saturday 29 March 1969.

Final

The 1969 FA Cup Final was contested by Manchester City and Leicester City at Wembley on Saturday 26 April 1969.  The match finished 1–0 to Manchester City who, behind West Ham United in 1975, are the second-last all-English team to win the FA Cup.

References
General
The FA Cup Archive at TheFA.com
English FA Cup 1968/69 at Soccerbase
F.A. Cup results 1968/69 at Footballsite
Specific

 
FA Cup seasons
Fa
Eng